Alison Fernandez (born July 20, 2005) is an American child actress best known for her role in ABC's Once Upon a Time as Lucy Mills and in the 2017 film Logan as Delilah. She has had recurring roles in Netflix's Orange Is the New Black and The CW's Jane the Virgin as Young Jane.

Early life and career 
Fernandez was born in Brooklyn, New York. She started her acting career at age five in New York City community theaters, She is the daughter of Manuel Fernandez, who has been her manager from the time she started acting. She has an older sister, Sabrina, who is also an actress. Fernandez received her education in acting for Theater, singing and choreography at the A Class Act N.Y.

Fernandez played Zara Amaro, Nick Amaro's daughter in Law & Order: Special Victims Unit in 2011. She made her film debut in the 2014 film Teenage Mutant Ninja Turtles as Rosa Mendez.

In 2016 she landed guest starring roles on three shows, Fresh Off the Boat, Another Period and Jane the Virgin. In 2017 she guest starred on Once Upon a Time as Lucy, and then had a regular starring role in the 7th season. She appeared in the X-Men film Logan as Delilah, and currently recurs on the Netflix dramedy series Orange Is the New Black, having first appeared on the show in 2013.

She co-starred in Freeform's Life-Size 2 in December 2018 opposite Tyra Banks and Francia Raisa.

Fernandez also landed the role of Amber in Team Kaylie. Then she obtained the role of Pepper Paloma in Upside-Down Magic.

She lives in Los Angeles.

Filmography

Films

Television

References

External links
 Alison Fernandez at Internet Movie Database
 

2005 births
American film actresses
Living people
American child actresses
American television actresses
Fernandez, Alison 2345
Hispanic and Latino American actresses
Actresses from New York City
21st-century American actresses